Presidential elections were held in Peru in 1903. Manuel Candamo of the Civilista Party was elected unopposed.

Results

References

Presidential elections in Peru
Peru
1903 in Peru
Single-candidate elections